White Spout is a waterfall in East Dunbartonshire, Scotland.

White Spout may also refer to:
 Steall Waterfall, which is called "The White Spout" in Gaelic
 Whitespout Linn, a waterfall in Scotland